The 2017–18 Montana Grizzlies basketball team represented the University of Montana during the 2017–18 NCAA Division I men's basketball season. The Grizzlies, led by fourth-year head coach Travis DeCuire, played their home games at Dahlberg Arena in Missoula, Montana as members of the Big Sky Conference. They finished the season 26–8, 16–2 in Big Sky play to win the Big Sky regular season championship. They defeated North Dakota, Northern Colorado, and Eastern Washington to be champions of the Big Sky tournament. They earned the Big Sky's automatic bid to the NCAA tournament where they lost in the first round to Michigan.

Previous season
The Grizzlies finished the 2016–17 season 16–16, 11–7 in Big Sky play to finish in a tie for fifth place. As the No. 5 seed in the Big Sky tournament, they lost to Idaho in the quarterfinals.

Offseason

Departures

Incoming transfers

2017 recruiting class

Roster

Schedule and results

|-
!colspan=9 style=| Exhibition

|-
!colspan=9 style=| Non-conference regular season

|-
!colspan=9 style=| Big Sky regular season

|-
!colspan=9 style=| Big Sky tournament

|-
!colspan=9 style=| NCAA tournament

See also
2017–18 Montana Lady Griz basketball team

References

Montana Grizzlies basketball seasons
Montana
Montana Grizzlies basketball
Montana Grizzlies basketball
Montana